Dark City is a 1998 neo-noir science fiction film directed by Alex Proyas and starring Rufus Sewell, William Hurt, Kiefer Sutherland, Jennifer Connelly, Richard O'Brien, and Ian Richardson. The screenplay was written by Proyas, Lem Dobbs, and David S. Goyer. In the film, Sewell plays an amnesiac man who, finding himself suspected of murder, attempts to discover his true identity and clear his name while on the run from the police and a mysterious group known as the "Strangers".

Primarily shot at Fox Studios Australia, the film was jointly produced by New Line Cinema and Proyas' production company Mystery Clock Cinema, and distributed by the former for theatrical release. It premiered in the United States on 27 February 1998 and received generally positive critiques, but it was a box-office bomb. Roger Ebert, in particular, supported the film, appreciating its art direction, set design, cinematography, special effects, and imagination, and even recorded an audio commentary for the film's home video release.

The film was nominated for the Hugo Award for Best Dramatic Presentation and six Saturn Awards. Some critics later noted Dark Citys similarities to and influence on the Matrix film series, whose first installment came out a year later, and the film is now widely considered a sci-fi cult classic.

Concerned that audiences would not understand the film, New Line asked Proyas to add an explanatory voice-over to the introduction, and he complied. When a director's cut of the film was released in 2008, among the changes was the removal of the opening narration.

Plot
John Murdoch awakens in a hotel bathtub, with amnesia. He receives a phone call from Dr. Daniel Schreber, who urges him to flee the hotel to evade a group of men who are after him. In the room, Murdoch discovers the corpse of a ritualistically murdered woman along with a bloody knife. He flees the scene, just as a group of pale men in trenchcoats ("the Strangers") arrive.

Police Inspector Frank Bumstead is looking for Murdoch as a suspect in a series of murdered prostitutes, though Murdoch cannot remember killing anybody. Following clues, Murdoch learns his own name and finds out he has a wife named Emma. When the Strangers catch up with him, he shows he has the ability to alter reality at will, which the Strangers can also do and refer to as "tuning", and he manages to use these powers to escape.

Murdoch wanders the streets of the anachronistic city, where nobody seems to notice the perpetual nighttime. At midnight, he watches as everyone else falls asleep and the Strangers have the city physically rearrange itself and, assisted by Schreber, change the inhabitant's identities and memories. He learns that he came from a coastal town called Shell Beach, which is familiar to everyone, though nobody knows how to get there, and all of his attempts to visit are unsuccessful. Meanwhile, the Strangers inject a copy of the memories given to Murdoch into one of their men, Mr. Hand, hoping it will help them predict Murdoch's movements and track him down.

Inspector Bumstead eventually catches Murdoch, though he acknowledges that Murdoch is most likely innocent, as by then he has his own misgivings about the nature of the city. They confront Schreber, who explains that the Strangers, which are extraterrestrials who use human corpses as their hosts, have a hive mind, and are experimenting with humans to analyze individuality in hopes of making a discovery that will help their race survive. Schreber also reveals that Murdoch is an anomaly who inadvertently awoke when Schreber was in the middle of imprinting his latest identity as a murderer.

Murdoch and Bumstead take Schreber and attempt to reach Shell Beach, but instead end up at a poster for the town on a wall at the edge of the city. Frustrated, Murdoch and Bumstead break through the wall, revealing outer space, just before some of the Strangers, including Mr. Hand, arrive with Emma as a hostage. In the ensuing fight, Bumstead and one of the Strangers fall through the hole and drift out into space, and the city is shown to be a deep space habitat surrounded by a force field.

The Strangers bring Murdoch to their home beneath the city and force Schreber to imprint Murdoch with their collective memory, believing Murdoch to be the culmination of their experiments. Schreber betrays them, however, and instead inserts false memories in Murdoch that artificially reestablish his childhood as years spent training and honing his tuning skills and learning about the Strangers and their machines. Murdoch awakens and, now able to fully realize his powers, frees himself and battles with the Strangers, defeating their leader Mr. Book in a psychokinetic fight high above the city.

After learning from Schreber that Emma has been re-imprinted and cannot be restored, Murdoch employs his powers, amplified by the Strangers' machine, to create an actual Shell Beach by flooding the area within the force field with water and forming a spit and beaches. On his way home, Murdoch encounters a dying Mr. Hand and informs him that the Strangers searched in the wrong place—the mind—to understand humanity. He rotates the habitat toward the star it had been turned away from, and the city experiences sunlight for the first time.

Opening a door leading out of the city, Murdoch steps out to view the sunrise. On the pier in front of him is the woman he knew as Emma, who now has new memories and a new identity as Anna. Murdoch reintroduces himself and they walk to Shell Beach, beginning their relationship anew.

Cast

 Rufus Sewell as John Murdoch
 William Hurt as Inspector Frank Bumstead
 Kiefer Sutherland as Dr. Daniel P. Schreber
 Jennifer Connelly as Emma Murdoch / Anna
 Richard O'Brien as Mr. Hand
 Ian Richardson as Mr. Book
 Bruce Spence as Mr. Wall
 Colin Friels as Detective Eddie Walenski
 John Bluthal as Karl Harris
 Mitchell Butel as Officer Husselbeck
 Melissa George as May
 Frank Gallacher as Chief Inspector Stromboli
 Ritchie Singer as Hotel Manager / Vendor
 Justin Monjo as Taxi Driver
 Nicholas Bell as Mr. Rain
 Satya Gumbert as Mr. Sleep (Noah Gumbert as Mr. Sleep Filming Double)
 Frederick Miragliotta as Mr. Quick
 Jeanette Cronin as a Stranger
 David Wenham as Schreber's Assistant
 Alan Cinis as Automat Cop
 Bill Highfield as Automat Cop
 Terry Bader as Mr. Jeremy Goodwin
 Rosemary Traynor as Mrs. Sylvia Goodwin
 Maureen O'Shaughnessy as Kate Walenski

Anita Kelsey provided the singing voice of Emma Murdoch.

Production

Influences
For Dark City, Proyas was influenced by film noir of the 1940s and the 1950s, such as The Maltese Falcon (1941). The film has additionally been described as Kafkaesque, and Proyas cited the TV series The Twilight Zone as a conscious influence. Proyas also wanted the film, though nominally science fiction, to have an element of horror to unsettle the audience.

Writing
Originally, Proyas conceived a story about a 1940s detective who is obsessed with facts and cannot solve a case where the facts do not make sense, saying: "He slowly starts to go insane through the story. He can't put the facts together because they don't add up to anything rational." In the process of creating the fictional world for the character of the detective, Proyas created other characters, and ended up shifting the focus of the film from the detective (Bumstead) to the person pursued by the detective (Murdoch). Proyas envisioned a robust narrative where the audience could examine the film from the perspective of multiple characters and focus on the plot.

After writing the first draft of the screenplay by himself, Proyas worked with Lem Dobbs and David S. Goyer to create the final script. Goyer had written The Crow: City of Angels (1996), the sequel to Proyas's 1994 film The Crow, and Proyas invited Goyer to co-write Dark City after reading Goyer's screenplay for Blade, which had yet to be released. The Writers Guild of America initially protested the crediting of more than two screenwriters for a film, but eventually relented and credited all three writers.

Design
When Proyas finished his preceding film, The Crow, in 1994, he approached production designer Patrick Tatopoulos to draw concepts for the world in which Dark City takes place. The city was entirely constructed on a set, and no practical locations were used in the film. Describing the city, Tatopoulos said:

The production design included themes of darkness, spirals, and clocks. There appears to be no sun in the city's world, and spiral designs that shrink when approached were used. The Strangers' large clock does not have any numbers, and Tatopoulos said: "But in a magical moment it becomes something more than just a clock." The production designer created the city architecture to have an organic presence alongside the structural elements.

The Strangers' lair is a large underground amphitheater, in which a sculpture of a human face hides a large clock and a spiraling device changes the layout of the city above. The film's budget was $30–40 million, so the crew used inexpensive techniques to build the set, such as stretching canvas onto welded metal frames. The lair also had a rail conveyance that appeared expensive. Tatopoulos said: "We had, obviously, a car built, but we had just one built. We laid some rail for it to ride on. We made a section of corridor that we kept driving through all the time, and you end up believing this thing is running along forever." Proyas wanted the rail car to pass various rooms, which was not feasible given the budget, so Tatopoulos and the crew used "replaceable elements and strong design textures" to give the impression it was passing different rooms.

The Strangers themselves are energy beings who reside in dead human bodies. At the beginning of the design process, the filmmakers considered having the Strangers be bugs, but they decided the bug appearance was overused. Tatopoulos said one day Proyas "called me and said he wanted something like an energy that kept re-powering itself, re-creating itself, re-shaping itself, sitting inside a dry piece of human shape."

Casting
About the character of Mr Hand, Proyas said: "I had Richard in mind physically when I wrote the character, because I had these strange, bald-looking men with an ethereal, androgynous quality", and O'Brien had famously played a similar character (Riff Raff) in The Rocky Horror Show. When Proyas visited London to cast the film, he met with O'Brien and found him suitable for the role.

Daniel P. Schreber, the character portrayed by Kiefer Sutherland, was named after Daniel Paul Schreber, a German judge with narcissistic, paranoid psychosis, and possibly schizophrenia, whose autobiographical Memoirs of My Nervous Illness (Denkwürdigkeiten eines Nervenkranken) (1903) inspired some elements of the film's plot. Hurt was originally asked to play Dr Schreber. Proyas said that Ben Kingsley was one of the original choices to portray Dr Schreber.

Soundtrack
The film's soundtrack was released on 24 February 1998 by TVT Records. It features music from the original score by Trevor Jones, and versions of the songs "Sway" and "The Night Has a Thousand Eyes" performed by singer Anita Kelsey. It also includes music by Hughes Hall from the trailer a song by Echo & the Bunnymen that played over the final credits, as well as songs by Gary Numan and Course of Empire that did not appear in the film. The music for the film was edited by Simon Leadley and Jim Harrison.

Release
New Line Cinema wanted the filmmakers to consider retitling the film Dark World or Dark Empire to help differentiate it from the recently released Mad City, but Dark City was kept as the title. The film was originally scheduled to be released in theaters on 17 October 1997, then 9 January 1998, and finally 27 February 1998, when it debuted in 1,754 theaters in the United States.

Home media
The film was released on VHS on 2 March 1999. A Region 1 widescreen DVD of the film was released in the United States on 29 July 1998. Special features on the DVD included two audio commentary tracks (one with film critic Roger Ebert, and one with director Alex Proyas, writers Lem Dobbs and David S. Goyer, and production designer Patrick Tatopoulos), cast and crew biographies and filmographies, comparisons to Fritz Lang's Metropolis, set design drawings, and the theatrical trailer.

A director's cut of Dark City was officially released on DVD and Blu-ray Disc on 29 July 2008. The director's cut removes the opening narration, which Proyas felt explained too much of the plot, and includes approximately eleven minutes of additional footage, most of which extends scenes already present in the theatrical release with additional establishing shots and dialogue. The DVD and Blu-Ray featured expanded audio commentaries by Ebert, Proyas, and Dobbs and Goyer, along with several new documentaries. The Blu-ray Disc also included the original theatrical cut of the film and the special features from the 1998 DVD release.

Reception

Critical response
Among mainstream critics in the U.S., the film received generally positive reviews. On review aggregator website Rotten Tomatoes, it has a 75% approval rating based 85 reviews, with an average score of 6.8/10; the site's "critics consensus" reads: "Stylishly gloomy, Dark City offers a polarizing whirl of arresting visuals and noirish action". On Metacritic, the film has a weighted average score of 66 out of 100 based on reviews from 23 critics.

Writing in the Chicago Sun-Times, Roger Ebert called the film a "great visionary achievement", while also exclaiming that it was "a film so original and exciting, it stirred my imagination like Metropolis and 2001: A Space Odyssey." In the San Francisco Chronicle, Peter Stack wrote that the film was "among the most memorable cinematic ventures in recent years", and "maybe there's nothing wrong with a movie that is simply sensational to look at." He felt the film's "twisting of reality and its daring look—layered and off-kilter grays, greens and blacks—make it click." In a mixed review, Walter Addiego of The San Francisco Examiner thought that "as a story, Dark City doesn't amount to much", its "complicated plot" containing important themes that were "no more than window dressing", but that "what counts here is the show, the creation of a strange world by a filmmaker who clearly knows science fiction and fantasy, past and present, and wants to share his love for it."

Unimpressed by the film, Marc Savlov of The Austin Chronicle wrote: "You really have to feel for Alex Proyas. This guy wears bad luck like the grimy trenchcoats of his protagonists, only his zipper's stuck and he can't seem to shake the damn thing off." He felt "Dark City looks like a million bucks (or rather, a million bucks gone to compost), but at its dark heart it's a tedious, bewildering affair, lovely to look at but with all the substance of a dissipating dream." Left equally disappointed was John Anderson of the Los Angeles Times, who said of the directing that "If you had to guess, you might say that Proyas came out of the world of comic art himself, rather than music videos and advertising. Dark City is constructed like panels in a Batman book, each picture striving for maximum dread", and that Proyas was "trying simultaneously to create a pure thriller and sci-fi nightmare along with his tongue-in-cheek critique of artifice. And this doesn't work out quite so well." Author TCh of Time Out felt that the development of the Murdoch character was "surprisingly engrossing" and thought the "art direction is always striking, and unlike most contemporary sci-fi, the movie does risk a cerebral approach, tapping a vein of postmodern paranoia."

Richard Corliss of Time said the film was "as cool and distant as the planet the Strangers come from. But, Lord, is Dark City a wonder to see." James Berardinelli writing for ReelViews, remarked that "Visually, this film isn't just impressive, it's a tour de force." and noted that "Dark City opens by immersing the audience in the midst of a fractured, nightmarish narrative." Berardinelli also said "Dark City appears to be New York during the first half of this century, but, using a style that is part science fiction, part noir thriller, and part gothic horror, [Proyas] has embellished it to create a surreal place unlike no other." Describing some pitfalls, Jeff Vice of the Deseret News said that "when critics talk about films being 'style over substance', they're definitely talking about movies like Dark City, which looks good but leaves an unpleasant aftertaste." He was quick to admit that "The special effects and set designs are dazzling", but ultimately felt "Proyas makes a crucial error in treating the subject even more seriously than The Crow, and the dialogue (co-written by Proyas and The Crow: City of Angels scriptwriter David S. Goyer) is unintentionally funny at times and often just plain dumb."

Andrea Basora of Newsweek, stated that director Proyas flooded the screen with "cinematic and literary references ranging from Murnau and Lang to Kafka and Orwell, creating a unique yet utterly convincing world". Similarly, David Sterritt wrote in The Christian Science Monitor that "The story is dark and often violent, but it's told with a remarkable sense of visual energy and imagination." Marshall Fine of USA Today found the film to be "Fascinating, visionary filmmaking", and said that "With its amber-tinged palette and its distinctively dystopian view of life, it may be the most unique-looking film we've seen in ages", but said that it "defies logic and makes frightening and unexpected leaps." Stephen Holden of The New York Times wrote that the "plot that Dark City builds on John's predicament is a confused affair" and that the film's premise is "unsettling enough to make you wonder if it could actually derail a seriously drug-addled mind."

Steve Biodrowski of Cinefantastique found the production design and the cinematography overwhelming, but he considered the narrative engagement of Sewell's amnesiac character to be ultimately successful, writing: "As the story progresses, the pieces of the puzzle fall into place, and we gradually realize that the film is not a murky muddle of visuals propping up a weak story. All the questions lead to answers, and the answers make sense within the fantasy framework." He compared Dark City to Proyas's preceding film, The Crow, in style, but found Dark City to introduce new themes and to be a "more thoroughly consistent" film. Biodrowski concluded that "Dark City may not provide profound answers, but it deals seriously with a profound idea, and does it in a way that is cathartic and even uplifting, without being contrived or condescending. As a technical achievement, it is superb, and that technique is put in the service of telling a story that would be difficult to realize any other way."

Box office
Its opening weekend in theaters, Dark City grossed $5,576,953, enough to place fourth at the box office; Titanic, which had been released ten weeks earlier, grossed $19,633,056 and was still number one. The following weekend, it earned $2,837,941 (a decrease of 49.1%) and dropped to ninth place, while Titanic remained in first with grosses totaling $17,605,849.

During its four-week theatrical run, the film earned $14,378,331 domestically. Internationally, it took in an additional $12,821,985, for a combined worldwide box office total of $27,200,316. The film's cumulative gross was the 105th-highest of 1998.

Accolades
The film won and was nominated for several awards in 1998. Film critic Roger Ebert cited it as the best film of 1998, and in 2005 he included it on his "Great Movies" list. Ebert used it in his teaching, and also recorded an audio commentary for the original DVD and the 2006 Director's Cut. The film was screened out of competition at the 1998 Cannes Film Festival.

Analysis

Theologian Gerard Loughlin interpreted Dark City as a retelling of Plato's Allegory of the Cave. For Loughlin, the city dwellers are prisoners who do not realize they are in a prison. John Murdoch's escape from the prison parallels the escape from the cave in the allegory. He is assisted by Dr. Schreber, who explains the city's mechanism as Socrates explains to Glaucon how the shadows in the cave are cast. Murdoch, however, becomes more than Glaucon: "He is a Glaucon who comes to realize that Socrates' tale of an upper, more real world, is itself a shadow, a forgery." Murdoch defeats the Strangers, who control the inhabitants, and remakes the world based on childhood memories, which were themselves illusions arranged by the Strangers. He casts new shadows for the city inhabitants, who must trust his judgment. Unlike Plato, Murdoch "is disabused of any hope of an outside" and becomes the demiurge for the cave, the only environment he knows. Of the lack of background provided in the film, Loughlin said: "The origin of the city is off-stage, unknown and unknowable."

The city in Dark City was described by Sarah L. Higley as a "murky, nightmarish German expressionist film noir depiction of urban repression and mechanism". It has a World War II-era dreariness reminiscent of Edward Hopper's works, as well as details from different eras and architectures that are changed by the Strangers: "buildings collapse as others emerge and battle with one another at the end". The round window of Murdoch's hotel room is concave like a fishbowl, and is a frequently seen element throughout the city. The inhabitants do not live at the top of the city; the main characters' homes are dwarfed by the bricolage of buildings.

The film contains motifs from Greek mythology, in which gods manipulate humans to serve a higher agenda. Proyas said: "I do like Greek mythology and have read a little of it, so maybe some of it has crept into the work, though I don't completely agree with that point of view."

Similarities to other works
The film's style is often compared to that of the works of Terry Gilliam (especially Brazil). Some stylistic similarities have also been noted to Jean-Pierre Jeunet and Marc Caro's 1995 film The City of Lost Children, another film that was particularly inspired by Gilliam (Gilliam had presented Jeunet's and Caro's previous film Delicatessen (1991), which was a deliberate homage to Gilliam's style, in North America).

The Matrix, which was released one year after Dark City, was also filmed at Fox Studios in Sydney, and it even used some of Dark Citys sets. Comparisons of the two films have made note of similarities in cinematography, atmosphere, and plot.

Fritz Lang's 1927 film Metropolis was a major influence on the architecture, concepts about the baseness of humans within a metropolis, and the general tone of Dark City. In one of the documentary shorts included on the director's cut home video releases of the film, the influence of the early German films M and Nosferatu are also mentioned.

One of the last scenes of the movie, in which buildings "restore" themselves, is similar to the last panel of the Akira manga, and Proyas has called the film's final battle an "homage to Otomo's Akira". Dark City has also drawn comparisons to the anime films Urusei Yatsura 2: Beautiful Dreamer (1984) and Megazone 23 (1985), as well as the 1993 video game Gadget Invention, Travel, & Adventure.

When Christopher Nolan first started thinking about writing the script for Inception, he was influenced by "that era of movies where you had The Matrix, you had Dark City, you had The Thirteenth Floor and, to a certain extent, you had Memento, too. They were based in the principles that the world around you might not be real".

Tie-ins
Mask of the Evil Apparition, a short film written and directed by Proyas and set in the Dark City cinematic universe, was released in 2021. During a Q&A session after a screening of the short film, Proyas revealed he was in the early stages of developing a Dark City series.

See also

 A Feasibility Study (The Outer Limits)
 List of films featuring space stations
 The Signal (2014 film)

References

Sources

External links

 
 
 
 
 

1990s science fiction drama films
1990s dystopian films
1998 films
American neo-noir films
American science fiction drama films
American dystopian films
Films about amnesia
Films directed by Alex Proyas
Films produced by Alex Proyas
Films shot in Sydney
Australian neo-noir films
Australian science fiction drama films
Films with screenplays by Alex Proyas
Films with screenplays by David S. Goyer
Films with screenplays by Lem Dobbs
Films about extraterrestrial life
Films about altered memories
Films set in outer space
Films scored by Trevor Jones
1998 drama films
1990s English-language films
1990s American films